Robertgurneya is a genus of copepods, containing the following species:

Robertgurneya arabica (Noodt, 1964)
Robertgurneya brevipes Wells & Rao, 1987
Robertgurneya dactylifer (C. B. Wilson, 1931)
Robertgurneya dictydiophora (Monard, 1928)
Robertgurneya diversa Lang, 1965
Robertgurneya ecaudata (Monard, 1936)
Robertgurneya erythraea (A. Scott, 1902)
Robertgurneya falklandiensis (Lang, 1936)
Robertgurneya hopkinsi Lang, 1965
Robertgurneya ilievecensis (Monard, 1935)
Robertgurneya intermedia Bozic, 1955
Robertgurneya oligochaeta Noodt, 1955
Robertgurneya remanei Klie, 1950
Robertgurneya rostrata (Gurney, 1927)
Robertgurneya simulans (Norman & T. Scott, 1905)
Robertgurneya smithi Hamond, 1973
Robertgurneya soyeri Apostolov, 1974
Robertgurneya spinulosa (G. O. Sars, 1911)
Robertgurneya tenax (Brian, 1927)

Taxonomic history
The genus Robertgurneya was first diagnosed by Karl Georg Herman Lang in 1944, with the name commemorating Robert Gurney. Since Lang did not designate a type species, as required by the International Code of Zoological Nomenclature for generic names published since 1930, that name is not "available". The first authors to explicitly designate a type species were Apostolov & Marinov in 1988, and they are therefore considered the authors of the genus.

References

Harpacticoida